Rita Paulsen,  born 26 February 1977 in Karagwe, Kagera Region, is a Tanzanian television personality, philanthropist, entrepreneur and founder and chief executive officer of Benchmark Productions, a company that prepares and hosts the Tanzanian television show Bongo Star Search.

Early life
Rita Paulsen was born in Karagwe district in Kagera Region on 26 February 1977. Her father was German and died while she was still very young. She initially wanted to become a lawyer, but due to an early pregnancy when she was still young at age of 14, this was not accomplished. Following that occasion she experienced segregation among her community. When she finally got her breakthrough and appeared as a celebrity, she aimed to use her experiences to encourage girls who face the same situation of early pregnancy to never give up.

Career

Paulsen is the founder and chief executive officer of the TV production company Benchmark Productions. The company produces the television show Bongo Star Search, in which Paulsen is the chief judge. Paulsen, when launching the show, was inspired by the American show American Idol. As with the American original, the goal of the show is to find and promote singing talents, especially young ones. The theme of Bongo Star Search is to help young Tanzanians with music talents to have the right singing skills through singing competitions.

She is also a host of 45 minutes television show that goes by her name Rita Paulsen Show. The show consists of three parts, named 'changing lives', 'celebrity corner' and 'Make Over'.

References 

Tanzanian television presenters
Women television personalities
Tanzanian activists
Tanzanian women activists
Living people
Year of birth missing (living people)
Tanzanian women television presenters